Happening for Lulu was the original title of a television series broadcast on BBC1 from 1968 to 1969 hosted by Lulu and produced by Stanley Dorfman. The show's title was changed to Lulu from episode 3, broadcast 11 January 1969. Jimi Hendrix was banned from the BBC after him and his band disrupted the show by changing the song list and continuing on to play after the allotted amount. Subsequent series were titled "It's Lulu!" but the final series broadcast in 1975 was the second to be titled simply 'Lulu'.

Episodes 
Series 1

Lulu (Series 2) 
Broadcast Saturdays on BBC1. Produced by Stewart Morris. Theme Song: The Man with the Golden Gun

External links

References 

1968 British television series debuts
1975 British television series endings
1960s British music television series
1970s British music television series